Ruellia diffusa is a plant native to the Cerrado vegetation of Brazil.

See also
 List of plants of Cerrado vegetation of Brazil

External links
 Arizona Fauna and Flora: Ruellia diffusa 
   Missouri Botanical Garden: illustration of Ruellia diffusa

diffusa
Flora of Brazil